The AAA Western Valley District was a high school conference in the state of Virginia that included the small number of schools in Central and Southwest Virginia which competed in Group AAA, is largest enrollment class of the Virginia High School League.

The Western Valley District schools competed in the AAA Northwest Region with the schools from the AAA Cardinal District, the AAA Cedar Run District, and the AAA Commonwealth District.

In the 2013–2014 school year, the schools of the Western Valley District were assigned to the previously Group AA based AA River Ridge District, AA Blue Ridge District, and AA Piedmont District. In the post-season, each school will compete against members of the same group classification only.

History
The Western Valley District was established in 2001 to consolidate the now defunct AAA Roanoke Valley District and the AAA Western District.  The two districts' memberships had dwindled to five and four members respectively.  Many schools in these districts had either lost student population or had experienced slow growth compared to the rest of Virginia, which made them eligible to drop to Group AA.  In 2001, two of the five members of the Roanoke Valley district dropped to the AA Blue Ridge District, prompting the consolidation with the Western district.  Below is a list of the Roanoke Valley and Western Districts in the 2000–2001 school year, and their districts for the 2001–2002 school year:

AAA Roanoke Valley District
Cave Spring (AAA Western Valley)
William Fleming (AA Blue Ridge)
Franklin County (AAA Western Valley)
Patrick Henry (AAA Western Valley)
Pulaski County (AA Blue Ridge)

AAA Western District
Albemarle (AAA Commonwealth)
E.C. Glass (AAA Western Valley)
Halifax County (AAA Western Valley)
George Washington (AAA Western Valley)

Cave Spring's student body was split to form Hidden Valley High School (Roanoke, Virginia) in 2002.  Both schools joined AA for the 2003–2004 school year, which reduced the district to five members.  In 2007, William Fleming of Roanoke returned to the district because of increased enrollment, reuniting it with cross-town rival Patrick Henry.

Travel concerns have been a major issue for schools in this district, as most other AAA schools are several hours away by driving. In football, where more points are earned for defeating AAA opponents than AA or A opponents, district members have had difficulty earning playoff spots and home field advantage.  This problem has been lessened by having several schools play the other district schools twice during the season, with the second game counting in the district standings.  The first game doesn't count in district standings but offers more playoff points than playing smaller local rivals.

Last Member schools
Franklin County High School of Rocky Mount, Virginia Eagles
George Washington High School of Danville, Virginia Eagles
Halifax County High School of South Boston, Virginia Comets
Patrick Henry High School of Roanoke, Virginia Patriots
William Fleming High School of Roanoke, Virginia Colonels

Assignments for 2013
Franklin County High School, Piedmont District; Group 6A, South Region, Conference 3
George Washington High School of Danville, Virginia, Piedmont District; Group 4A, North Region, Conference 24
Halifax County High School of South Boston, Virginia, Piedmont District; Group 5A, North Region, Conference 16
Patrick Henry High School, River Ridge District; Group 6A, South Region, Conference 3
William Fleming High School of Roanoke, Virginia, Blue Ridge District; Group 4A, North Region, Conference 24

Former members of the AAA Western Valley District and its Predecessors
Albemarle
Amherst County (dropped to AA)
Andrew Lewis (Salem, 1920s – 1977)
Cave Spring (Roanoke (1970–2002, split to form Hidden Valley High, dropped to AA in 2003)
E.C. Glass (Lynchburg, dropped to AA in 2009)
Heritage (Lynchburg, 1970s – 1993, dropped to AA)
Jefferson Sr.(Roanoke, 1920s – 1974)
Northside (Roanoke, 1970–1988, dropped to AA in 1988)
Pulaski County (1974–2001, dropped to AA)
Robert E. Lee (Staunton, 1970s)
Salem (1977–1988)

References

Virginia High School League